SoftwareValet is a software installer for BeOS, originally developed by Starcode Software. It has been included with BeOS since 1998, when Be Inc. purchased Starcode's assets.

It was originally developed for web deployment of applications, where a user would click on an 'Install with SoftwareValet' link on a website, and the BeOS web browser at the time, NetPositive, would launch SoftwareValet. It also handled product registration and software updates through a (now defunct) centralised server, BeDepot (bedepot.com).

SoftwareValet applications could also be distributed in non-web delivered upkg files, which are non-self executing, encapsulated installer files. Installation is based on direct file locations and shell scripts, and has very little chance of user manipulation; although a file format break in BeOS R4.5 allowed package makers to use non-direct paths, as a preparation for making the OS multi-user.

The compression format is known to be based on zlib, but no tools other than SoftwareValet exist for manipulating packages. 

A companion application, PackageBuilder was also bundled with the BeOS developer tools, and was used for creating packages, or editing existing ones.

BeOS software